Pyramios is an extinct genus of diprotodont from the Miocene of Australia. It was very large, reaching  a length of about 2.5 m (8.2 feet) and a height of about 1.5 m (4.92 feet). Pyramios is estimated to have weighed 700 kg (1102-1543 pounds). It was comparable in size to its cousin Diprotodon, which is also in the family Diprotodontidae.

References

 Prehistoric Mammals of Australia and New Guinea: One Hundred Million Years of Evolution by John A. Long, Michael Archer, Timothy Flannery, and Suzanne Hand (page 16)

Miocene marsupials
Prehistoric mammals of Australia
Prehistoric marsupial genera
Fossil taxa described in 1967
Prehistoric vombatiforms